In the Battle of Hohenlinden on 3 December 1800, a French army commanded by Jean Victor Marie Moreau decisively defeated the army of Habsburg monarchy led by Archduke John. The first action of the campaign was the Battle of Ampfing, two days earlier. After Hohenlinden there was a series of rearguard clashes beginning on 9 December at Rosenheim and continuing from the 14th through the 20th at Salzburg, Neumarkt am Wallersee, Frankenmarkt, Schwanenstadt, Vöcklabruck, Lambach, and Kremsmünster. During the retreat, the Habsburg army began a process of disintegration and an armistice was concluded a few days later.

For an explanation of the types of forces, see Types of military forces in the Napoleonic Wars.

Austrian-Bavarian Army

Organization

General-Major Archduke John of Austria (46,130 infantry, 14,131 cavalry, 3,724 other)
Deputy Commander: Feldzeugmeister Franz von Lauer
Chief-of-staff: Oberst Franz von Weyrother

Right Column
Feldmarschall-Leutnant Michael von Kienmayer (12,611 infantry, 3,370 cavalry)
 Artillery: 12 horse guns, 14 foot guns
 Division: Feldmarschall-Leutnant Karl Philipp, Prince of Schwarzenberg
 Brigade: General-Major Johann Hennequin de Fresnel
 Siegenburg-Wallachisch Grenz Infantry Regiment Nr. 1 (1 battalion)
 Peterwardeiner Grenz Infantry Regiment Nr. 4 (1 battalion)
 Coburg Dragoon Regiment Nr. 6 (6 squadrons)
 Mack Cuirassier Regiment Nr. 10 (890 in 6 squadrons)
 Brigade: General-Major Hieronymus Candiani
 Archduke Ferdinand Karl Infantry Regiment Nr. 2 (2,696 in 3 battalions)
 Württemberg Infantry Regiment Nr. 38 (1,590 in 2 battalions)
 Brigade: General-Major Alois von Gavasini
 Clerfayt Infantry Regiment Nr. 9 (2 battalions)
 Gemmingen Infantry Regiment Nr. 21 (1,988 in 3 battalions)
 De Ligne Infantry Regiment Nr. 30 (1 battalion)
 Murray Infantry Regiment Nr. 55 (1,615 in 2 battalions)
 Beaulieu Infantry Regiment Nr. 58 (2 battalions)
 Division: Feldmarschall-Leutnant Archduke Ferdinand Karl Joseph of Austria-Este
 Brigade: Feldmarschall-Leutnant Archduke Ferdinand
 Gradiscaner Grenz Infantry Regiment Nr. 1 (1 battalion)
 Peterwardeiner Grenz Infantry Regiment Nr. 2 (1 battalion)
 Wenkheim Infantry Regiment Nr. 35 (1,994 in 3 battalions)
 Stain Infantry Regiment Nr. 50 (2,003 in 3 battalions)
 Brigade: General-Major Karl von Vincent
 vacant Dragoon Regiment Nr. 13 (6 squadrons)
 Brigade: General-Major Konrad Weeber
 Kaiser Cuirassier Regiment Nr. 1 (910 in 6 squadrons)

Right Center Column
Feldmarschall-Leutnant Louis-Willibrord-Antoine Baillet de Latour (8,346 infantry, 2,520 cavalry)
 Artillery: 12 horse guns, 14 foot guns
 Division: Feldmarschall-Leutnant Frederick VI, Landgrave of Hesse-Homburg
 Brigade: General-Major Karl O'Donell von Tyrconell
 Olivier Wallis Infantry Regiment Nr. 29 (2,108 in 3 battalions)
 Lacy Infantry Regiment Nr. 22 (1,999 in 3 battalions)
 Brigade: General-Major Karl Roszowski
 Ferdinand I of Austria Dragoon Regiment Nr. 2 (6 squadrons)
 Brigade: General-Major Peter Dienersperg
 Nassau Cuirassier Regiment Nr. 9 (6 squadrons)
 Division: Feldmarschall-Leutnant Prince Friedrich Karl Wilhelm of Hohenlohe-Ingelfingen
 Brigade: General-Major David Majthany
 Brechainville Infantry Regiment Nr. 25 (1,611 in 2 battalions)
 DeVins Infantry Regiment Nr. 37 (792 in 1 battalion)
 Brigade: General-Major Paul Esterházy
 Latour Dragoon Regiment Nr. 11 (822 in 6 squadrons),
 Zeschwitz Cuirassier Regiment Nr. 5 (801 in 6 squadrons)

Left Center Column
Feldzeugmeister Johann Kollowrat (14,987 infantry, 5,109 cavalry)
 Avantgarde: General-Major Franz Löpper
 General-Major Daniel Mécsery
 Motschlitz Uhlan Regiment Nr. 2 (8 squadrons)
 Mészáros Hussar Regiment Nr. 10 (8 squadrons)
 Tyroler Schützen (10 companies)
 Wurmser Freikorps (12 companies)
 Artillery: 12 horse guns, 14 foot guns
 Division: Feldmarschall-Leutnant Vincenz Maria Kolowrat-Liebsteinsky
 Brigade: General-Major Lelio Spannocchi
 Sebottendorf Grenadier Battalion
 Tegetthof Grenadier Battalion
 Vouvermanns Grenadier Battalion
 Eichler Grenadier Battalion
 Infantry Regiment Nr. 60 (2,394 in 3 battalions)
 Brigade: General-Major Joseph Beyer
 Eggerdes Grenadier Battalion
 DeLigne Grenadier Battalion
 Papp Grenadier Battalion
 Morwitz Grenadier Battalion
 Benjowsky Infantry Regiment Nr. 31 (2,597 in 3 battalions)
 Bavarian Division: Feldmarschall-Leutnant Christian Zweibrücken (7,017 infantry, 828 cavalry)
 Brigade: General-Major Bernhard Erasmus von Deroy
 Metzen Light Battalion
 Reuss Grenadier Battalion
 Minucci Line Battalion
 Stengel Line Battalion
 Schlossberg Line Battalion
 Brigade: General-Major Karl Philipp von Wrede
 Pompei Line Battalion
 Preysing Line Battalion
 Bureck Line Battalion
 Dallwigk Line Battalion
 2 companies of Light Infantry
 Attached:
 Uhlan Regiment (828 in 5-1/2 squadrons)
 8 horse guns
 18 foot guns
 Cavalry Division: Feldmarschall-Leutnant Johann I Joseph, Prince of Liechtenstein
 Brigade: General-Major Christian Wolfskeel zu Reichenberg
 Vecsey Hussar Regiment Nr. 4 (1,189 in 8 squadrons)
 Duke Albert Cuirassier Regiment Nr. 3 (6 squadrons)
 Lorraine Cuirassier Regiment Nr. 7 (6 squadrons)
 Brigade: General-Major Philipp Grünne de Pichard
 Hohenzollern Cuirassier Regiment Nr. 8 (6 squadrons)
 Archduke Ferdinand-Este Hussar Regiment Nr. 3 (1,205 in 6 squadrons)
 Volunteer Hussars (898 in 4 squadrons)

Left Column
Feldmarschall-Leutnant Johann Sigismund Riesch (10,186 infantry, 3,132 cavalry)
 Artillery: 12 horse guns, 14 foot guns
 Division: Feldmarschall-Leutnant Maximilian, Count of Merveldt
 Brigade: General-Major Joseph Klein
 Wenzel Colloredo Infantry Regiment Nr. 56 (2,114 in 3 battalions)
 Archduke Charles Infantry Regiment Nr. 3 (2,090 in 3 battalions)
 Brigade: General-Major Philipp Görger
 Waldeck Dragoon Regiment Nr. 7 (888 in 6 squadrons)
 Anspach Cuirassier Regiment Nr. 11 (911 in 6 squadrons)
 Division: Feldmarschall-Leutnant Ignaz Gyulai
 Brigade: General-Major Ernst Leuven
 Manfreddini Infantry Regiment Nr. 12 (2,107 in 3 battalions)
 Kaunitz Infantry Regiment Nr. 20 (2,105 in 3 battalions)
 Brigade: General-Major Albert Stahel
 Kinsky Dragoon Regiment Nr. 12 (478 in 6 squadrons)
 Archduke Franz Cuirassier Regiment Nr. 2 (855 in 6 squadrons)

Generals

French Army

Organization

General of Division Jean Victor Marie Moreau (41,990 infantry, 11,805 cavalry, 1,935 artillery, 99 guns)Chief of Staff: General of Division Jean-Joseph Dessolles

Left Wing
 General of Division Paul Grenier
 1st Division: General of Division Claude Legrand (7,930, 12 guns)
 Brigades: Generals of Brigade Charles Saligny de San-Germano, Juste Pasteur Sabatier, François Bontemps
 16th Line Infantry Demi-Brigade (2,072)
 42nd Line Infantry Demi-Brigade (2,043)
 51st Line Infantry Demi-Brigade (2,118)
 12th Cavalry Regiment (316)
 5th Chasseurs à Cheval Regiment (574)
 16th Chasseurs à Cheval Regiment (516)
 2nd Division: General of Division Michel Ney (9,630, 12 guns)
 Brigades: Generals of Brigade Jean Pierre François Bonet, Gabriel Poissonnier Desperièrres, Dominique Joba
 15th Line Infantry Demi-Brigade (2,046)
 23rd Line Infantry Demi-Brigade (1,456)
 76th Line Infantry Demi-Brigade (2,337)
 103rd Line Infantry Demi-Brigade (1,643)
 Converged Grenadiers (763)
 19th Cavalry Regiment (193)
 13th Dragoon Regiment (425)
 8th Chasseurs à Cheval Regiment (487)
 3rd Division: General of Brigade Louis Bastoul, vice General of Division Jean Hardy, wounded (6,315, 16 guns)
 Brigades: General of Brigade Jean Fauconnet
 53rd Line Infantry Demi-Brigade (2,007)
 89th Line Infantry Demi-Brigade (2,053)
 13th Cavalry Regiment (271)
 17th Cavalry Regiment (387)
 2nd Dragoon Regiment (686)
 23rd Chasseurs à Cheval Regiment (700)

Reserve

General of Division Jean Victor Moreau
 Artillery: General of Brigade Jean Baptiste Eblé (6 guns)
 Cavalry: General of Division Jean-Joseph Ange d'Hautpoul (1,738 cavalry, 6 guns)
 Brigades: Generals of Brigade Jean-Louis-Brigitte Espagne, Jean Laurent Justin La Coste Duvivier
 1st Carabinier Regiment (391)
 2nd Carabinier Regiment (397)
 8th Cavalry Regiment (325)
 9th Cavalry Regiment (328)
 Volunteer Hussars (137)
 1st company/3rd Horse Artillery Regiment

 1st Division: General of Division Emmanuel Grouchy (8,615, 12 guns)
 Brigades: Generals of Brigade Charles Louis Grandjean, Charles Boyé
 46th Line Infantry Demi-Brigade (2,298)
 57th Line Infantry Demi-Brigade (2,353)
 108th Line Infantry Demi-Brigade (2,234)
 6th Cavalry Regiment (272)
 11th Chasseurs à Cheval Regiment (500)
 4th Hussar Regiment (627)
 1st company/3rd Artillery Regiment
 5th company/3rd Sapper Battalion
 2nd Division: General of Division Antoine Richepanse (10,735, 14 guns)
 Brigades: Generals of Brigade Frédéric Henri Walther, Jean-Baptiste Drouet, Jean-Baptiste Lorcet, Louis Michel Antoine Sahuc
 8th Line Infantry Demi-Brigade (2,680)
 27th Line Infantry Demi-Brigade (2,438)
 48th Line Infantry Demi-Brigade (2,192)
 1st battalion/14th Light Infantry Demi-Brigade (849)
 10th Cavalry Regiment (300)
 1st Chasseurs à Cheval Regiment (610)
 20th Chasseurs à Cheval Regiment (698)
 5th Hussar Regiment (596)
 4th company/3rd Horse Artillery Regiment
 6th company/3rd Horse Artillery Regiment
 20th company/2nd Artillery Regiment
 7th company/4th Sapper Battalion

 3rd Division: General of Division Charles Decaen (10,161, 12 guns)
 Brigades: Generals of Brigade Jean Louis Debilly, Pierre François Joseph Durutte, Karol Kniaziewicz
 4th Line Infantry Demi-Brigade (2,000)
 100th Line Infantry Demi-Brigade (1,992)
 2nd and 3rd battalions/14th Light Infantry Demi-Brigade (1,451)
 Polish Danube Legion (2,312)
 17th Dragoon Regiment (442)
 6th Chasseurs à Cheval (665)
 10th Chasseurs à Cheval (562)
 Polish Lancers (400)
 2nd company/3rd Horse Artillery Regiment
 3rd company/5th Artillery Regiment
 Polish Artillery
 1st company/4th Sapper Battalion

Right Wing

'General of Division Claude Lecourbe (19,663 infantry, 2,915 cavalry, 36 guns)
 1st Division: General of Division Gabriel Jean Joseph Molitor (5,240 infantry, 1,016 cavalry, 11 guns)
 Brigade: General of Brigade Henri Jardon
 1st Light Infantry Demi-Brigade (1 battalion)
 10th Light Infantry Demi-Brigade (2 battalions)
 83rd Line Infantry Demi-Brigade (3 battalions)
 6th Hussar Regiment (3 squadrons)
 7th Hussar Regiment (4 squadrons)
 2nd Division: General of Division Charles-Étienne Gudin de La Sablonnière (7,588 infantry, 605 cavalry, 9 guns)
 Brigades: Generals of Brigade Anne-Gilbert Laval, Jacques-Pierre-Louis Puthod
 10th Light Infantry Demi-Brigade (1 battalion)
 36th Line Infantry Demi-Brigade (3 battalions)
 38th Line Infantry Demi-Brigade (3 battalions)
 94th Line Infantry Demi-Brigade (3 battalions)
 8th Hussar Regiment (4 squadrons)
 3rd Division: General of Division Joseph Hélie Désiré Perruquet de Montrichard (6,835 infantry, 413 cavalry, 13 guns)
 Brigades: Generals of Brigade Roussel, Joseph Schiner
 37th Line Infantry Demi-Brigade (3 battalions)
 84th Line Infantry Demi-Brigade (3 battalions)
 109th Line Infantry Demi-Brigade (3 battalions)
 9th Hussar Regiment (4 squadrons)
 Reserve Cavalry: General of Brigade Étienne Marie Antoine Champion de Nansouty (881 cavalry, 3 guns)
 11th Dragoon Regiment (4 squadrons)
 23rd Chasseurs à Cheval (4 squadrons)
 Artillery Park: (3 guns)

Generals

Notes
Footnotes

Citations

References

Books
 Arnold, James R. Marengo & Hohenlinden. Barnsley, South Yorkshire, UK: Pen & Sword, 2005. 
 Pivka, Otto von (pseud.). Armies of the Napoleonic Era. New York: Taplinger Publishing, 1979. 
 Smith, Digby. The Napoleonic Wars Data Book. London: Greenhill, 1998.

External links
The following items are excellent sources for the full names and service histories of French and Austrian generals.
 Smith, Digby & Kudrna, Leopold (compiler). napoleon-series.org Austrian generals 1792-1815
 French Wikipedia, Liste des généraux de la Révolution et du Premier Empire

French Revolutionary Wars orders of battle